Lake Shawnee is an unincorporated community in Mercer County, West Virginia, United States.

Lake Shawnee Amusement Park, abandoned in 1966, occupies a desecrated native burial ground which was the site of the 1783 Mitchell Clay settler farm. Three of the Clay children (Bartley, Tabitha, Ezekial) were killed by a band of natives; Mitchell Clay led a group of settlers in bloody retaliation, killing several natives. In the 1920s, businessman Conley T. Snidow purchased the site of the Clay farm for development as an amusement park. At least six amusement patrons were killed while the park was in operation; a little girl on the circling swing set was hit after a truck backed into the path of the swing, and a boy drowned in the amusement park's swimming pond. The park's structures and rides are still standing, abandoned and in disrepair. Tours are offered in the days leading up to Halloween, in which the site is described as being "cursed" or "haunted".

References

Unincorporated communities in Mercer County, West Virginia
Unincorporated communities in West Virginia